was a Japanese actor, voice actor and narrator who was affiliated with Aoni Production. Some of his major voice roles included the Dragon Ball anime series, which he narrated and voiced Dr. Briefs, Kaiō-sama ( King Kai or North Kaio), and Bobbidi. Other major roles included Dr. Isaac Gilmore in Cyborg 009; Gennai in Digimon; Ittan Momen in GeGeGe no Kitarō; Dr. Yumi in Mazinger Z; and numerous characters in the Time Bokan series.

On September 25, 2015, Toei Animation announced that Yanami would be taking medical leave from Dragon Ball Super for an indefinite amount of time. His roles as the narrator and Kaiō-sama were passed to Naoki Tatsuta.

Death
He died on December 3, 2021, at the age of 90.

Filmography

Animation

Film

Japanese dubbing
Live-action

Animation

Drama CD

Video games

References

External links 
 Official agency profile 
 Jōji Yanami at GamePlaza Haruka Voice Artist Database 
 
 
 

1931 births
2021 deaths
Aoni Production voice actors
Japanese male video game actors
Japanese male voice actors
Male voice actors from Fukuoka Prefecture
Male voice actors from Tokyo
Tokyo Actor's Consumer's Cooperative Society voice actors